The discography of Melt-Banana, a Japanese noise rock band, consists of eight studio albums, two live albums and numerous EPs and singles.

Albums

Studio albums

Live albums

Compilation albums

Singles and EPs

Cassettes
July 1993 - Melt-Banana (released by Iguana Coax)
September 1993 - How Come Banana?? (released by Iguana Coax)
October 1993 - Raw Egg Till Morning (released by Iguana Coax)
September 1994 - Cactuses Come in the Flocks (released by Chocolate Monk)

Compilation appearances and remixes

External links
Melt-Banana official site
A-ZAP Records official site
Melt-Banana discography at Discogs
Melt-Banana at AllMusic

Discographies of Japanese artists
Rock music group discographies